Maud Geffray is a French pop musician.

Life 
Maud Geffray is part of the Scratch Massive group. In 2015, Maud Geffrey published a first solo album named 1994. This is the soundtrack of a film shot during a rave in 1994 on a beach between Quiberon and Carnac.

In 2017, she released a second album, Polaar. This album was produced during a winter residency in  Rovaniemi in northern Finland, with a commission from the Louvre. She composed a musical film inspired by the life of the inhabitants and adolescents in the dark. It's dark 22 hours a day.

In November 2017, as a guest of the Variations festival, organized by the musical magazine Sourdoreille, Maud Geffray joined the Dutch harpist, Lavinia Meijer to honor the minimalist and repetitive contemporary music of Philip Glass on the stage of La Cigale.

Maud Geffray also composed the soundtrack for the documentary film Southern Belle by director Nicolas Peduzzi (released in April 2018), which portrays a lost and decadent American youth through the figure of Taelor, heir to an oil tycoon.

Maud Geffray is a part of the programming as a DJ of the Wet for me, organized by the feminist and lesbian collective Barbi (e) turix.

Discography  

 2015  1994, Vinyl album
 2017, Polaar, Pan European Recording
 2018, film soundtrack for Southern Belle

References

External links 

Living people
French pop musicians
21st-century French musicians
21st-century French women musicians
Year of birth missing (living people)